Eulepidotis corrina is a moth of the family Erebidae first described by Pieter Cramer in 1775. It is found in the Neotropics, including Suriname and Trinidad.

References

Moths described in 1775
corrina
Taxa named by Pieter Cramer